The Kolkata Youth Theatre Festival popularly known as KYTF. This Youth Theatre Festival was launched by Shriek of Silence(S.O.S). After the grand success of the festival in 2014, Kolkata Youth Theatre Festival  is primed to become bigger and better. The festival is unique with different genres of theatre melting in the same pot.

Introduction
Kolkata being the cultural capital of the country is also synonymous with theatre, legends like Girish Ghosh, Utpal Dutta, Sambhu Mitra and many others have contributed to the upliftment of the theatre scenario in the city. Shriek of Silence (S.O.S) steps forward to contribute to the current theatre scenario on its birthday. Kolkata Youth Theatre Festival is launched by Shriek of Silence. It is a confluence point of celebrities and theatre veterans along with upcoming thespians.

History
The Kolkata Youth Theatre Festival began in the year 2014 under the aegis of Shriek of Silence (S.O.S).
 
 Shows
 
The Stone Age 
Merchant Of Venice -The Kolkata Musical  
Jawab
Hitchcock
The East Side Story

References

External links
The Telegraph Article 
Times of India Article 
The Hindu Article 
Times of India Article 
Ei Samay Article 
The Telegraph Article 
Ebela Article
Kolkata Youth Theatre Festival Page 
Shriek Of Silence (S.O.S) Page 
Youtube Music Video 
Ebela Article 
The Times of India

Theatre festivals in India